Velem is a village in Vas county, Hungary. The village is situated on the slopes of Kőszeg Mountains, at the westernmost tip of the county and the region known as Alpokalja (Lower Alps). Velem is notable for its picturesque environment and healthy climate.

History 
Velem was first mentioned in records in 1279. One of the notable archaeological sights of Central Europe can be found on St. Vid Hill above the village. The church on the top of the hill can be seen from several kilometers away. Owing to the excellent climatic conditions, Velem has become a well-known resort and holiday centre with full infrastructure. In the village there is a House of Crafts preserving the tradition of local folk arts.

At the end of World War II the Szálasi Government was based in a prominent Velem mansion called the Stirling Villa. The Holy Crown of Hungary was preserved and safeguarded there between 29 December 1944 and 19 March 1945.
Today the Stirling Villa is a venue for seminars and conferences while the House of Crafts next door hosts workshops where traditional and almost forgotten crafts can be learnt from experienced craftsmen. Preserving traditions is an organic part of this village where wooden barns stand among houses mainly built of stone and vernacular wine presses with cellars dotted along the Pákó Stream (Pákó-patak).

There is a still operational water mill situated near the village. The starting point of the national 'blue' tourist route is in Velem. The village is situated on the grounds of Írottkő Nature Park with a bicycle route crossing the village. The most frequently visited local event is the Chestnut Feast (Gesztenyeünnep) in October every year.

Archaeology

Velem and its surroundings were already inhabited in the Neolithic. The remains of a Bronze Age fortified settlement dating from the 16th century BC have also been excavated. The settlement controlled a significant trade route passing through the mountains. Due to the copper and antimony found nearby, a metal processing and metalworking centre of outstanding importance was formed besides the fortification. One of the most spectacular results of the excavations is a gold diadem dating from the 14th-9th centuries BC, during the Urnfield culture period. Further excavations have been carried out since 1973 by staff at the Savaria Museum, in which, in addition to the citadel, residential buildings on the terraces on the east and south sides of the mountain have been excavated.

Notable residents 
Mari Törőcsik, a major Hungarian actress.
Gyula Maár, a noted film director and husband of Mari Törőcsik.

References

External links 
 Street map (Hungarian)
 A blog about the water mill (Hungarian)

Populated places in Vas County